The Mansfield A. Daniels House is a historic house located 2 miles southwest of Scobey in Daniels County, Montana. It was added to the National Register of Historic Places on June 4, 1997.

Description and history 
Built in 1912, it is a -story single dwelling residence of frame construction in the Craftsman style. The layout of the house is essentially a square main block with a cross-gabled roof, and a projecting rear wing. The interior is still finished in the original oak flooring, windows, and doors, as well as tin ceilings some rooms and on portions of the kitchen walls.

It was built by/for Mansfield A. Daniels, the namesake of Daniels County.

References

Houses in Daniels County, Montana
Houses on the National Register of Historic Places in Montana
National Register of Historic Places in Daniels County, Montana
Houses completed in 1912
American Craftsman architecture in Montana
1912 establishments in Montana